The Foster Natural Gas/Oil Report, formerly known as the Foster Natural Gas Report and Foster Associates Report, is a U.S.-based weekly newsletter published by Foster Associates, Inc.  It was founded in Washington, D.C. on March 23, 1956 by J. Rhoades Foster and a group of economists. Its editor-in-chief is Edgar D. Boshart. 

The report publishes news about issues and events relevant to the regulated natural gas and oil market in North America. Topics of interest include production, marketing, transportation, distribution and end use. It reviews activities at the Federal Energy Regulatory Commission (FERC) and the National Energy Board (NEB) of Canada and well as the public hearings and rulings of state regulatory agencies.  The report also covers leaders in politics, industry and regulatory entities related to the natural gas industry and public utility companies.

See also

 Oil & Gas Journal – a leading petroleum industry weekly publication
 Plattsprovides energy and metals information and benchmark price assessments in the physical energy markets

References

External links

Magazines established in 1956
Petroleum industry
Reports on finance and business
Weekly magazines published in the United States
Energy magazines
Petroleum magazines
English-language magazines
Magazines published in Washington, D.C.
Magazines published in Maryland